MV Princess of Acadia may refer to:

, was the former , a passenger and car ferry, before being renamed and reassigned in 1963 to running between Saint John, New Brunswick and Digby, Nova Scotia until 1971.
, is the second ferry of this name, running between Saint John, New Brunswick and Digby, Nova Scotia since 1971.

Ferries of Nova Scotia
Ferries of New Brunswick
Transport in Digby County, Nova Scotia
Transport in Saint John, New Brunswick